Numerous vessels have been named Beaver, for the beaver:

 Beaver, one of the ships involved in the Boston Tea Party in 1773
  was launched on the Thames in 1793. She traded between London and Canada but in 1796 she became a whaler in the Southern whale fishery. The Spanish captured her in 1797. 
  was launched in 1796 at Liverpool. She made seven complete voyages as a slave ship in the triangular trade in enslaved persons. She was captured and retaken once, in 1804, and captured a second time in 1807, during her eighth voyage.
 , an American merchant vessel
 , a steamship 1835–1892, important in the history of British Columbia, 
 , a steamboat
 , a steam tugboat in Australia launched in 1886
 , see boats of the Mackenzie River watershed
 , see boats of the Mackenzie River watershed

Naval vessels
 , any one of 10 vessels

See also
Beaver (disambiguation)

Ship names